Cosmosoma telephus is a moth of the subfamily Arctiinae. It was described by Francis Walker in 1854. It is found in Colombia, Venezuela and Espírito Santo, Brazil.

References

telephus
Moths described in 1854